Isaac Karabtchevsky (born December 27, 1934 in São Paulo) is a Brazilian conductor of Russian-Jewish ancestry. He studied music and conducting in Germany, where his teachers included Wolfgang Fortner, Pierre Boulez and Carl Ueter.

Karabtchevsky conducted the Brazilian Symphony Orchestra,  (Rio de Janeiro) from 1969 to 1996. From 1988 to 1994, he was principal conductor of the Tonkünstler Orchestra, (Vienna). From 1995 to 2001, he was music director of the Teatro La Fenice (Venice). Since 2003, Karabtchevsky has been the artistic director of the Porto Alegre Symphony Orchestra (Porto Alegre). He was music director of the Orchestre National des Pays de la Loire (Nantes et Angers) from 2004 to 2009. Today, Karabtchevsky is the Music Director of the Petrobras Symphony, one of the leading orchestras in Brazil.

External links
 Official Isaac Karabtchevsky homepage

to watch and listen:

Musicians from São Paulo
Brazilian conductors (music)
Brazilian Jews
Brazilian people of Russian-Jewish descent
1934 births
Living people
21st-century conductors (music)